Erik James Olson (born January 4, 1977) is a former American football defensive back in the National Football League (NFL) who played for the Jacksonville Jaguars. He was drafted in the seventh round of the 2000 NFL Draft. He played college football at Colorado State University.

References 

1977 births
Living people
People from Ventura, California
Players of American football from California
Sportspeople from Ventura County, California
American football defensive backs
Colorado State Rams football players
Jacksonville Jaguars players